Black Point is a rocky promontory of  projecting 800 m northwards from the northeast coast of Ioannes Paulus II Peninsula into Hero Bay, Livingston Island in the South Shetland Islands, Antarctica to form the east side of the entrance to Porlier Bay.  The area was visited by early 19th century sealers.

The name of the point is a descriptive one. Fortín Rock is a sea stack lying off Black Point.

Location
British mapping in 1968, Chilean in 1971, Argentine in 1980, Spanish in 1991, and Bulgarian in 2005 and 2009.

Map
 L.L. Ivanov et al. Antarctica: Livingston Island and Greenwich Island, South Shetland Islands. Scale 1:100000 topographic map. Sofia: Antarctic Place-names Commission of Bulgaria, 2005.

Notes

References
 Black Point. SCAR Composite Antarctic Gazetteer

Headlands of Livingston Island